The 2015–16 North Dakota State Bison women's basketball represent North Dakota State University in the 2015–16 NCAA Division I women's basketball season. The Bison, led second year head by Maren Walseth, play their home games at the Bentson Bunker Fieldhouse with 2 games at Scheels Arena, due to renovations at the Bison Sports Arena, and are members of The Summit League. They finished the season 7–22, 2–14 in Summit League play to finish in last place. They failed to qualify for The Summit League women's tournament.

Roster

Schedule

|-
!colspan=9 style="background:#008000; color:#FFFF00;"| Exhibition

|-
!colspan=9 style="background:#008000; color:#FFFF00;"| Non-conference regular season

|-
!colspan=9 style="background:#008000; color:#FFFF00;"| The Summit League regular season

References

See also
2015–16 North Dakota State Bison men's basketball team

North Dakota State Bison women's basketball seasons
North Dakota State